Travis Todd Hall (born August 3, 1972 in Soldotna, Alaska) is a retired NFL defensive end who last played for the San Francisco 49ers. He went to Brigham Young University. He was drafted by the Atlanta Falcons in the 6th round (181st overall) in the 1995 NFL Draft. He played 10 years with the Falcons before signing a free agent contract with the 49ers in 2005.

Before his professional career, Hall, a multi-sport athlete, wrestled, played hockey, and football while in high school at West Jordan High School (1990).

Travis formed ProSpot Fitness in 1998. ProSpot Fitness, Inc. develops, manufactures and markets home gyms featuring the company's patented Grab & Go technology.

External links 
Player Profile
ProSpot Fitness

1972 births
Living people
American football defensive tackles
American football defensive ends
Players of American football from Alaska
BYU Cougars football players
San Francisco 49ers players
Atlanta Falcons players
People from Soldotna, Alaska